Gussola is a comune (municipality) in the Province of Cremona in the Italian region Lombardy, located about  southeast of Milan and about  southeast of Cremona.

Gussola borders the following municipalities: Colorno, Martignana di Po, San Giovanni in Croce, Scandolara Ravara, Sissa Trecasali, Solarolo Rainerio, Torricella del Pizzo.

References

Cities and towns in Lombardy